Ernest John Atkins (19 December 1916 – 1 March 1942) was an Australian rules footballer who played with Melbourne in the Victorian Football League (VFL).

He was an able seaman on HMAS Perth; and he died during World War II when HMAS Perth was hit by a Japanese torpedo during the Battle of Sunda Strait. His service number was PM2929.

Family
The son of former University footballer, Ernest Faram "Ernie" Atkins (1890–1972), and Vera Ethel Atkins, née Clendinnen, Ernest John Atkins was born on 19 December 1916.

See also
 List of Victorian Football League players who died in active service

Sources
 Holmesby, Russell & Main, Jim (2007). The Encyclopedia of AFL Footballers. 7th ed. Melbourne: Bas Publishing.
  Main, J. & Allen, D., "Atkins, John", pp. 207–208 in Main, J. & Allen, D., Fallen – The Ultimate Heroes: Footballers Who Never Returned From War, Crown Content, (Melbourne), 2002.
 Taylor, Percy, "Melbourne are Proud of their Great War Record", The Australasian, (Saturday, 24 June 1944), p.23.
 Roll of Honour: Able Seaman Ernest John Atkins (PM2929), Australian War Memorial.
 World War Two Nominal Roll: Able Seaman Ernest John Atkins (PM2929). 
 World War Two Service Record: Able Seaman Ernest John Atkins (PM2929), Australian National Archives.

External links
 
 DemonWiki profile
 Boyles Football Photos: Jack Atkins

1916 births
1942 deaths
Australian rules footballers from Victoria (Australia)
Melbourne Football Club players
Old Melburnians Football Club players
Australian military personnel killed in World War II
Royal Australian Navy personnel of World War II
Royal Australian Navy sailors
Deaths due to shipwreck at sea
Military personnel from Victoria (Australia)